The 2022 Middle Tennessee Blue Raiders baseball team represented the Middle Tennessee State University in the sport of baseball for the 2022 college baseball season. The Blue Raiders competed in Division I of the National Collegiate Athletic Association (NCAA) and in Conference USA. They played their home games at Reese Smith Jr. Field in Murfreesboro, Tennessee. The team was coached by Jim Toman, who was in his fourth season with the Blue Raiders.

Preseason

C-USA media poll
The Conference USA preseason poll was released on February 16, 2022 with the Blue Raiders predicted to finish in tenth place in the conference.

Personnel

Schedule and results

Schedule Source:
*Rankings are based on the team's current ranking in the D1Baseball poll.

Postseason

References

External links
•	Middle Tennessee Baseball

Middle Tennessee
Middle Tennessee Blue Raiders baseball seasons
Middle Tennessee Blue Raiders baseball